Carmen Bassingthwaighte (born 16 March 1986 in Windhoek, Namibia) is a Namibian professional racing cyclist. In 2009, she won the Namibian National Road Race Championships.

References

External links
 
 

1986 births
Living people
Namibian female cyclists
Sportspeople from Windhoek
20th-century Namibian women
21st-century Namibian women